Softly as a Summer Breeze is an album by American jazz organist Jimmy Smith featuring performances recorded in 1958 but not released on the Blue Note label until 1965. The album was rereleased on CD with four bonus tracks recorded at a later session.

Reception
The Allmusic review by Scott Yanow awarded the album 3 stars stating

Track listing
 "These Foolish Things" (Harry Link, Holt Marvell, Jack Strachey) – 5:27
 "Hackensack" (Thelonious Monk) – 5:58
 "It Could Happen to You" (Johnny Burke, Jimmy Van Heusen) – 6:16
 "Sometimes I'm Happy" (Irving Caesar, Vincent Youmans) – 8:21
 "Someone to Watch Over Me" (George Gershwin, Ira Gershwin) – 6:30
 "One for Philly Joe" [aka "Home Cookin'"] (Jimmy Smith) – 4:46

Bonus tracks on 1998 CD reissue
 "Willow Weep for Me" (Ann Ronell) – 3:24 
 "Ain't No Use" (Leroy Kirkland, Sidney Wyche) – 2:40 
 "Angel Eyes" (Earl Brent, Matt Dennis) – 3:25 
 "Ain't That Love" (Ray Charles) – 2:45 
Recorded at Manhattan Towers, New York, on February 26, 1958 (tracks 1-6) and at Rudy Van Gelder Studio in Hackensack, New Jersey, on October 14, 1958 (tracks 7-10).

Personnel

Musicians
 Jimmy Smith – organ
 Kenny Burrell – guitar, (tracks 1-4)
 Eddie McFadden – guitar, (tracks 5 & 6)
 Ray Crawford – guitar, (tracks 7-10)
 Philly Joe Jones – drums, (tracks 1-4)
 Donald Bailey – drums, (tracks 5-10) 
 Bill Henderson – vocals, (tracks 7-10)

Technical
 Alfred Lion – producer
 Rudy Van Gelder – engineer
 Reid Miles – design
 Jean-Pierre Leloir – photography
 Leonard Feather – liner notes

References

Blue Note Records albums
Jimmy Smith (musician) albums
1965 albums
Albums recorded at Van Gelder Studio
Albums produced by Alfred Lion